Oregon Route 453 (OR 453) is an Oregon state highway running from OR 454 near Adrian to State Line Road on the Idaho state line near Adrian. OR 453 is known as the Adrian-Arena Valley Highway No. 453 (see Oregon highways and routes).

OR 453 was established in 2003 as part of Oregon's project to assign route numbers to highways that previously were not assigned, and, as of July 2018, was unsigned.

Route description

OR 453 begins at an intersection with OR 454 approximately one mile southeast of Adrian and heads east, south, east, crossing OR 454 again, at the Idaho state line at an intersection with State Line Road.

History

OR 453 was assigned to the Adrian-Arena Valley Highway in 2003.

Major intersections

References

453
Transportation in Malheur County, Oregon